Naat (Punjabi and ) is poetry in praise of the Islamic prophet, Muhammad. The practice is popular in South Asia (Bangladesh, Pakistan and India), commonly in Bengali, Punjabi or Urdu. People who recite Naat are known as Naat Khawan or sanaa-khuaan. Exclusive "Praise to Allah" and Allah alone is called Hamd, not to be confused with 'Na'at'.

In Arab countries, lyrics and praises said for Muhammad are called Madih nabawi.

History
It is difficult to trace the history of Naat khawani since no authenticated record of when it was initiated can be found.  One early author, Hassan, was known as Shair-e Darbaar-e Risalat.  Even before accepting Islam he was a poet, but after embracing Islam he gave a new turn to his poetry and started writing Na'ats in honor of Muhammad. He was famous for his poetry that defended Muhammad in response to rival poets who attacked him and his religion. Therefore, Hassan is known as the first sana-khawaan (naat reciter) of that time. After that many a poet followed this trend and totally dedicated themselves towards writing of naats.

Tala al Badru Alayna, is a traditional Islamic poem known as nasheed recited to Muhammad during his completion of migration to Medina in 622 CE, is believed to be one of the earliest naats.

Language
Commonly the term naʽat shareef (exalted poetry) is reserved for poetry in the praise of Muhammad. In Arabic, na'at is usually called madih (praise) or nasheed (poetry), although the latter can describe any type of religious poetry.

Urdu Na'at Anthologies
Hadaiqe Bakshish by Ahmad Raza Khan
Wasail e Bakhsish by Muhammad Ilyas Qadri
Farsh Par Arsh, 2009 by Abūlḥāmid Muḥammad
Tajalliyāt,  by Syed Waheed Ashraf First Ed.(1996), Second Ed.(2018) , Maktaba Jamia Ltd, Shamshad Market, Aligarh 202002, India
Urdū zabān men̲ naʻt goʼī kā fann aur tajallīyāt, 2001 by Syed Waheed Ashraf
 safeena e bakhshish by Akhtar Raza Khan (Azhari Miya)

Notable Na'at Khawans

Urdu Na'at poets
Ahmed Raza Khan
Mustafa Raza Khan
Muhammad Ilyas Qadri
Mushtaq Qadri
Syed Waheed Ashraf
Amir Khusro
Muzaffar Warsi
Akhtar Raza Khan
Muhammad Iqbal
Behzad Lucknavi

Urdu Na'at Reciters

Sabihuddin Rehmani
Junaid Jamshed
Abrar ul Haq
Syed Fasihuddin Soharwardy
Siddiq Ismail
Khursheed Ahmad
Abdul Rauf Rufi
Qari Waheed Zafar Qasmi
Bekal Utsahi
Ajmal Sultanpuri
Hassan ibn Thabit
Mushtaq Qadri

See also
Hamd
Islam in South Asia

References 

Cultural depictions of Muhammad
Islamic worship
Islamic poetry
Islamic culture
Urdu-language poetry
Sufism
Islamic music
Pakistani music
Bengali poetry
Bengali music
Bangladeshi music
 
Devotional literature
Islamic terminology
Islam in South Asia